Dobongsan is a mountain in Bukhansan National Park, South Korea. It extends across Seoul, the national capital, and the cities of Yangju and Uijeongbu, in the province of Gyeonggi-do. Nearby Dobongsan Station is named after it.

It is known for the magnificent rock formations of the Manjang-bong, Seonin-bong, Ju-bong, O-bong and Uiam-bong Peaks. The Seonin-bong summit has 37 hiking courses connecting to it, including the famous Bakjwi (Bat) Course. The mountain is also home to Cheonchuk-sa Buddhist Temple, the oldest temple in the region, and several other temples including Mangwol-sa, Wonhyo-sa and Hoeryong-sa, as well as a number of beautiful valleys called Donong, Songchu, Obong and Yeongeo-cheon. Furthermore, it is easily accessible by public transportation.

Hiking course

Gallery

See also
List of mountains in Seoul
List of mountains in Korea

References

Mountains of South Korea
Mountains of Gyeonggi Province